Eoreuma confederata is a moth in the family Crambidae. It was described by Alexander Barrett Klots in 1970. It is found in North America, where it has been recorded from Texas.

References

Haimbachiini
Moths described in 1970